The Alliance of Christian Unity (KET) was a political party in Hungary during the early 1920s.

History
The party first contested national elections in 1922, winning five seats in the parliamentary elections that year.

After 1922 the KET did not contest any further elections.

References

Defunct political parties in Hungary
Christian political parties in Hungary